The North Branch Historic District is a historic district located in North Branch, Somerset County, New Jersey. It is on the western side of the North Branch of the Raritan River in Branchburg Township. The district reflects the 18th and 19th century architecture of this agricultural community, once built around a mill on the North Branch. A main feature is the stone house of Jacob Ten Eyck, with its Georgian influences. The district was added to the National Register of Historic Places on April 16, 2012, for its significance in architecture and community development.

Jacob Ten Eyck house
In 1700, Matthias Ten Eyck (1658–1741), a farmer from Old Hurley, Ulster County, New York and son of Coenradt Ten Eyck, purchased 400 acres north of North Branch from John Johnston, and another 100 acres in 1702. In 1721, Matthias sold this property to his son Jacob Ten Eyck (1693–1753). Jacob settled here and built a -story stone house between 1725 and 1733. His first son Jacob Ten Eyck (1733–1794) inherited the house and later, in 1792, built a second story onto it.

Gallery of contributing properties

See also
National Register of Historic Places listings in Somerset County, New Jersey

References

External links

Branchburg, New Jersey
National Register of Historic Places in Somerset County, New Jersey
Historic districts on the National Register of Historic Places in New Jersey
Georgian architecture in New Jersey
New Jersey Register of Historic Places